Mooreland is a town in Woodward County, Oklahoma, United States,  east of the city of Woodward, the county seat. The population was 1,190 at the 2010 census.

History
The Southern Kansas Railway, later the Atchison, Topeka and Santa Fe Railway, constructed a line in 1886/1887 and then furnished an accessible shipping point for the region.  After the opening of Cherokee Outlet in 1893, homesteaders made efforts that resulted in the town of Mooreland.

Prosperous area resident J. H. Dail joined F. J. Knittel, John J. Bouquot, John E. Moseley, and William M. Holmes in founding the Mooreland Town Company.  They and others realized the agricultural potential of the area and the possibility of immense crop production.

Mooreland Town Company founded the town of 'Dail City, named for its chief proprietor, in 1901.  The company purchased land from the Knittel homestead and the W. F. Jones homestead for the platting of the original town site.  Others helpful in development of Mooreland included John T. Davis, C. L. Lambert, J. C. Krouth, and John Arnold.  Residents quickly petitioned the federal government for a post office.  Because of already another "Dail" in Oklahoma Territory, the government denied the request.  Residents then selected the name "Moreland."  An error occurred when an extra "o" inadvertently crept into the name on the official plat and registration.

In March 1902, the government established the first Mooreland post office with F. M. Jones as first appointed postmaster.  Mooreland Leader newspaper began publishing in 1903 and continues today.

The economy always depended on farming, primarily wheat and grain.  An agricultural service center within a few years of its founding, the community supported four stores, two liveries, three grain elevators, a feed mill, saloons, restaurants, hotels, and medical personnel.

A minor oil boom occurred around the time of World War I.  Mooreland began smaller than Woodward, Curtis, and Quinlan, Oklahoma.  Curtis and Quinlan withered, but Mooreland and Woodward continued to prosper.

Mooreland celebrated its centennial in 2001 with the publication of a history book.  The community includes a school district, six churches, a newspaper, an airport, farmers cooperative and elevators, and several dozen retail and service businesses necessary for survival of the town.  Primary employers include Mooreland Public Schools, Western Farmers Electric Cooperative, and Prather Cues (a pool cue stick company).

Geography
Mooreland is located at  (36.437517, -99.205420).

Demographics

As of the census of 2000, there were 1,226 people, 477 households, and 336 families residing in the town. There were 554 housing units at an average density of 671.0 per square mile (257.7/km2). The racial makeup of the town was 95.02% White, 2.37% Native American, 0.08% Asian, 1.88% from other races, and 0.65% from two or more races. Hispanic or Latino of any race were 3.83% of the population.

There were 477 households, out of which 34.2% had children under the age of 18 living with them, 56.8% were married couples living together, 10.7% had a female householder with no husband present, and 29.4% were non-families. 27.5% of all households were made up of individuals, and 15.7% had someone living alone who was 65 years of age or older. The average household size was 2.47 and the average family size was 2.99.

In the town, the population was spread out, with 27.6% under the age of 18, 5.7% from 18 to 24, 23.8% from 25 to 44, 20.9% from 45 to 64, and 22.0% who were 65 years of age or older. The median age was 40 years. For every 100 females, there were 82.2 males. For every 100 females age 18 and over, there were 80.9 males.

The median income for a household in the town was $31,680, and the median income for a family was $38,654. Males had a median income of $28,906 versus $21,574 for females. The per capita income for the town was $16,657. About 9.0% of families and 10.4% of the population were below the poverty line, including 15.0% of those under age 18 and 2.7% of those age 65 or over.

Notable people
 Troy Ruttman, Indianapolis 500 winner 1952, at age 22 the youngest winner of the Indy 500.
 Joyce Eilers, Composer

References

External links
 Mooreland High School
 

Towns in Oklahoma
Towns in Woodward County, Oklahoma